Alpen may refer to:
 Alps, mountain range in Europe
 Alpen, Alberta, Canada
 Alpen, Germany, a municipality in North Rhine-Westphalia, Germany
 Alpen (food), a British muesli and breakfast cereal brand

See also
 Alpena (disambiguation)
 Alpens, province of Barcelona, Catalonia, Spain